The Arizona Cyclone is a 1928 American silent Western film directed by Edgar Lewis, and written by William Berke and Gardner Bradford. The film stars Fred Humes, George B. French, Margaret Gray, Cuyler Supplee, Gilbert Holmes, and Ben Corbett. The film was released on May 6, 1928, by Universal Pictures.

Cast     
 Fred Humes as Larry Day / Tom Day
 George B. French as John Cosgrove
 Margaret Gray as Kathleen Cosgrove
 Cuyler Supplee as Mel Craven
 Gilbert Holmes as Pee Wee 
 Ben Corbett as Benny 
 Richard L'Estrange as Lazy Lester 
 Scotty Mattraw as Scotty 
 Lightning as Larry's Horse

References

External links
 

1928 films
1928 Western (genre) films
Universal Pictures films
Films directed by Edgar Lewis
American black-and-white films
Silent American Western (genre) films
1920s English-language films
1920s American films